Lowake is an unincorporated community in northwestern Concho County, Texas, United States, along the Concho River.  It lies along FM 381 north of the town of Paint Rock, the county seat of Concho County.  Its elevation is 1,752 feet (534 m).  Although Lowake is unincorporated, it has a post office, with the ZIP code of 76855; the post office was established in 1909.

Founded in 1909, midway between Miles and Paint Rock, Lowake was named for local farmers named Lowe and Schlake, upon whose land the community was built.  Lowake's school was merged with that of Paint Rock in the 1950s.

Despite its small size, Lowake was well known in the 1960s as the site of a famous Lowake Steakhouse. In 2017, the steakhouse moved to a new location in Rowena.

At least two steakhouses were there, one of which was the Lowake Inn, a restaurant and gathering place for locals in this small community. Travelers to Lowake not only came by road, but also by air; a nearby airstrip allowed pilots of small aircraft to come and go, within easy walking distance of the inn.

References

External links
Profile of Lowake from the Handbook of Texas Online

Unincorporated communities in Concho County, Texas
Unincorporated communities in Texas